Abdan District is in Deyr County, Bushehr province, Iran. At the 2006 census, its population was 7,726 in 1,519 households, at which time its constituent parts were in the Central District. The following census in 2011 counted 7,909 people in 1,854 households. At the latest census in 2016, the district had 8,529 inhabitants living in 2,278 households, by which time it had achieved the status of a district.

References 

Districts of Bushehr Province
Populated places in Deyr County